A Secret Affair is a 1999 American made-for-television romantic drama film directed by Bobby Roth and starring Janine Turner. It is based on Barbara Taylor Bradford's novel of the same name.

Synopsis
Vanessa Stewart (Turner) has the soul of an artist, but her business tycoon father insists that she follow in his footsteps. As a result, Vanessa convinces herself that she wants to be a globetrotting executive, and also that she truly loves the man to whom she is engaged. But while in Venice on a business trip at the behest of her father, Vanessa meets and falls in love with adventurous Irish TV war correspondent Bill Fitzgerald (Behan). Deciding to kick over the traces, Vanessa is prepared to turn her back on her family obligations and plight her troth with Bill. But fate, as it often does, takes a hand in matters when Bill is reported killed during a dangerous combat assignment.

External links
 
 

1999 television films
1999 films
1999 romantic drama films
American romantic drama films
CBS network films
Films directed by Bobby Roth
Films set in Venice
American drama television films
1990s English-language films
1990s American films